Scott Wittman (born November 16, 1954) is an American director, lyricist, composer and writer for Broadway, concerts, and television.

Life and career
Wittman was raised in Nanuet, New York, graduated from Nanuet Senior High School in 1972 and attended Emerson College in Boston for two years before leaving to pursue a career in musical theatre in New York City. While directing a show for a Greenwich Village club he met songwriter and composer Marc Shaiman, and the two became collaborators and professional partners. While Shaiman wrote for television shows, including Saturday Night Live, Wittman directed concerts for such artists as Bette Midler, Christine Ebersole, Raquel Welch, Dame Edna Everage, and Lypsinka, among others.

In 2002, Shaiman and Wittman wrote the music and lyrics for the musical Hairspray, which won the Drama Desk Award for Outstanding Lyrics, the Tony Award for Best Original Score, and a Grammy Award. In addition to Hairspray, Wittman conceived, wrote lyrics for, and directed Martin Short: Fame Becomes Me and conceived and directed Matters of the Heart, a solo concert by Patti LuPone in 2000.

Shaiman and Wittman worked on Catch Me If You Can, a musical adaptation of the 2002 Steven Spielberg film, together with Terrence McNally. The musical opened on Broadway in April 2011. They again worked together on Charlie and the Chocolate Factory the Musical.

In 2011, Hairspray was performed at Nanuet Senior High School, where Wittman attended high school.

In 2013, Wittman and Marc Shaiman co-wrote the score for Bombshell, a musical about Marilyn Monroe within the context of the NBC television show Smash. A soundtrack was released later that same year.

Wittman and Shaiman collaborated in 2018 on Mary Poppins Returns where Wittman wrote the lyrics for nine of the tracks listed. He and Shaiman were nominated for the Academy Award for Best Original Song for the song "The Place Where Lost Things Go".

In 2021, Wittman and Shaiman wrote a song entitled "Save the City" for the Marvel Cinematic Universe (MCU) in-universe Broadway production, titled Rogers: The Musical featured in the first episode of Hawkeye, "Never Meet Your Heroes".  It was released as a single on November 24, the day the episode became available on Disney+.

In February 2021, it was announced that Wittman and Shaiman were writing songs for a new musical adaptation of Some Like It Hot, due on Broadway in 2022, with a book by Amber Ruffin and Matthew Lopez.

References

External links

1954 births
American musical theatre directors
American musical theatre lyricists
Broadway composers and lyricists
Drama Desk Award winners
Grammy Award winners
LGBT theatre directors
American LGBT musicians
Living people
Tony Award winners
Place of birth missing (living people)